Samir Duro (born 18 October 1977) is a Bosnian retired professional footballer.

Club career
Duro previously played for Sarajevo in the Bosnian Premier League and Međimurje in the Croatian Prva HNL.

International career
Duro made his debut for Bosnia and Herzegovina in an October 1999 European Championship qualification match away against Estonia and has earned a total of 7 caps, scoring no goals. His final international was an August 2002 friendly match against Serbia and Montenegro.

References

External links
 

1977 births
Living people
People from Konjic
Bosniaks of Bosnia and Herzegovina
Association football midfielders
Bosnia and Herzegovina footballers
Bosnia and Herzegovina international footballers
FK Igman Konjic players
FK Sarajevo players
NK Maribor players
PAS Giannina F.C. players
FC Saturn Ramenskoye players
FK Željezničar Sarajevo players
NK Celje players
NK Međimurje players
NK Čelik Zenica players
HNK Šibenik players
HŠK Zrinjski Mostar players
FK Rudar Kakanj players
Premier League of Bosnia and Herzegovina players
Slovenian PrvaLiga players
Super League Greece players
Russian Premier League players
Croatian Football League players
First League of the Federation of Bosnia and Herzegovina players
Bosnia and Herzegovina expatriate footballers
Expatriate footballers in Slovenia
Bosnia and Herzegovina expatriate sportspeople in Slovenia
Expatriate footballers in Greece
Bosnia and Herzegovina expatriate sportspeople in Greece
Expatriate footballers in Russia
Bosnia and Herzegovina expatriate sportspeople in Russia
Expatriate footballers in Croatia
Bosnia and Herzegovina expatriate sportspeople in Croatia